Tokaranodicera is a genus of beetles in the family Buprestidae, containing the following species:

 Tokaranodicera nishidai (Toyama, 1986)
 Tokaranodicera shimonoi Hattori, 2005

References

Buprestidae genera